The Guantang LNG Terminal is a liquefied natural gas (LNG) terminal under construction in Datan Borough, Guanyin District, Taoyuan City, Taiwan.

History
The terminal design was originally drafted in 2015. In 2018, the government considered relocating the terminal but rejected this idea because the new proposed site was reserved for a planned offshore wind farm. On 8 October 2018, the terminal project passed its environmental impact assessment. The construction of the terminal is expected to be completed by 2025.

Architecture
The terminal will span an area of 9 km2. The original location of the terminal was proposed to be 455 meters from the coastline. However, due to pressure from environmental activists over to the existence of a sensitive coral reef in the nearby area, the terminal was redesigned to be 750 meters further away, with a total distance of around 1.2 km out to the sea from the shoreline. The relocation design was expected to add NT$15 billion to the cost of the project, for an estimated total cost of NT$75 billion.

See also
 List of LNG terminals

References

Buildings and structures in Taoyuan City
Buildings and structures under construction in Taiwan
Liquefied natural gas terminals in Taiwan